

Insects

Vertebrates

Data courtesy of George Olshevsky's dinosaur genera list.

Expeditions, field work, and fossil discoveries
 April: William Edmund Cutler prospected in Dinosaur Provincial Park. His work was underwritten by the Calgary Syndicate for Prehistoric Research, a group of local philanthropist businessmen, and a small local museum, the Calgary Public Museum, which no long exists.
 Summer: The American Museum of Natural History dispatched a team of fossil hunters to Dinosaur Provincial Park. Cutler joined the expedition but was "asked to leave" after only a few months of involvement.
 Cutler excavated a juvenile Gryposaurus now catalogued by the Canadian Museum of Nature as CMN 8784. The site of the excavation has since been designated "quarry 252".
 Winter: Cutler partly prepared the young Gryposaurus specimen, possibly in Calgary while working on dinosaurs for Euston Sisely.
 A US Geological Survey crew headed by Eugene Stebinger and a US National Museum crew headed by Charles Gilmore worked together to excavate the first dinosaur discovery of the Two Medicine Formation.

See also

References

1910s in paleontology
Paleontology
Paleontology 3